Coiled-coil domain-containing protein 93 is a protein that in humans is encoded by the CCDC93 gene.

See also 
 Coiled-coil

References

External links

Further reading